In the Next Life is the sixth studio album by American singer-songwriter Maria Taylor, also a member of Azure Ray. It was released on December 9, 2016, on her label Flower Moon Records. The first single "If Only", features guest vocals by Omaha singer-songwriter Conor Oberst of Bright Eyes.

Stereogum premiered the album's first single "If Only" on October 19, 2016 and Billboard debuted the exclusive premiere of the video shot in Joshua Tree and directed by Liz Bretz. "If Only" was featured during the closing scenes of NBC's fall drama, This Is Us. NPR premiered the full album stream on "First Listen" saying "she's made perhaps her warmest and most affecting album... and filled it with gorgeous, touching songs about family, legacy, fear and the pursuit of contentment." On December 5, "Free Song" was featured as KCRW's "Today's Top Tune." Buzzbands.LA said "In the Next Lifes 10 poignant vignettes wrap with the closer "Pretty Scars" (which features Joshua Radin), a musical timeline of Taylor mileposts that's breathtaking in its intimacy.". In their review of the album, Innocent Words said "Taylor has one of the most remarkable singing voices of the last 20 years... One that is more comforting than bombastic, more soulful than aggressive. She is real."

Track listing

Personnel
Maria Taylor – lead vocals, guitar, piano, drums
Nik Freitas – guitar, keys, drums, bass, vocals, tambourine
Macey Taylor – bass, piano, banjo, guitar, vocals
Tiffany Osborn – violin, viola, glockenspiel
Conor Oberst – vocals (track: 3)
Louis Schefano – vocals (tracks: 4 and 9)
Jake Bellows – guitar and vocals (track: 8)
Morgan Nagler – vocals (track: 8)
Mike Bloom – lap steel (track: 7)
Joshua Radin – vocals (tracks: 7 and 10)
Ryan Dwyer – vocals (track: 9)Production'
Nik Freitas – production, recording, engineer, mixing (tracks: 1, 2, 4, 6, 9 and 10)
Maria Taylor – producer
Andy LeMaster – mixing (tracks: 3 and 8)
Mike Bloom – mixing (tracks: 5 and 7)
Louis Schefano – additional recordings (track: 3, 4, 5, 6, and 9)

References

2016 albums
Maria Taylor albums